Taieri may refer to several features in the Otago Region of New Zealand:
Taieri River
Strath Taieri, a glacial valley and river plateau
Taieri Gorge
Taieri Plain
Taieri Island / Moturata, an island in the river mouth
Taieri Mouth, a village at the river mouth
Taieri Aerodrome
The Taieri statistical area, which surrounds Whare Flat
Taieri (New Zealand electorate)
Taieri County, a former territorial authority